In jazz music, the lydian chord is the major 711 chord, or 11 chord, the chord built on the first degree of the Lydian mode, the sharp eleventh being a compound augmented fourth. This chord, built on C, is shown below.

 

This is described as "beautiful" and "modern sounding." The notes that make up the Lydian chord represent five of the seven notes of the Lydian mode, and the 11 at the top of the chord is the 4 (one octave higher) that distinguishes the Lydian mode from the major scale.

Major 711 may also refer to the Lydian augmented chord, an augmented seventh chord with augmented fourth appearing in the Lydian augmented scale.

 

In a chord chart the notation, "Lydian" indicates a major family chord with an added augmented eleventh, including maj711, add911, and 611.

Harmonic function
Lydian chords may function as subdominants or substitutes for the tonic in major keys. The interval of the sixth is used even though it is described after other compound intervals, and perhaps should also be a compound interval (i.e., thirteenth). The interval is considered to be the compound interval (i.e., thirteenth) when appearing with the Maj7th in the initial chord.The dominant 711 or Lydian dominant (C711) comprises the notes:

r, 3, (5), 7, (9), 11, (13)

Basing this chord on the pitch C results in the pitches:

C, E, G, B, (D), F, (A)

The same chord type may also be voiced:

C, E, B, F, A, D, F

This voicing omits the perfect fifth (G) and raises the major ninth (D) by an octave. The augmented eleventh (F) is also played twice in two different registers. This is known as "doubling".

References

Eleventh chords